The 1956–57 Hong Kong First Division League season was the 46th since its establishment.

League table

References
1956–57  Hong Kong First Division table (RSSSF)

Hong Kong First Division League seasons
Hong
1956–57 in Hong Kong football